Josef "Sepp" Straka (born 1 May 1993) is an Austrian professional golfer who plays on the PGA Tour, where he won the 2022 Honda Classic.

Personal life
Straka was born in Vienna, Austria, to an American mother and an Austrian father. His family moved to Valdosta, Georgia, when Straka was aged 14. His twin brother, Sam, also played on the golf team at the University of Georgia, where Straka graduated in business management.

Amateur career
Straka represented Austria, on the same team as his twin brother Sam, at the 2011 European Boys' Team Championship. Team Austria finished second (a tied all-time best), losing in the final against Spain with Jon Rahm on the team.

Straka played collegiate golf at the University of Georgia from 2011 to 2016, not playing during the 2013–2014 season.

Professional career
Straka turned professional after completing college and played a number of tournaments on the 2016 PGA Tour Canada. He qualified for the 2017 Web.com Tour season. His best finish in 25 events was 7th in the El Bosque Mexico Championship.

Straka became the first Austrian golfer to earn a PGA Tour card, after finishing tied for 20th on the 2018 Web.com Tour Finals money list, after finishing tied for 3rd place in the Web.com Tour Championship. Earlier in the year, Straka secured his first professional victory by winning the Web.com Tour's KC Golf Classic by one stroke.

In his first season on the PGA Tour, Straka's best finish was a 3rd place at the 2019 Barbasol Championship, the alternate event to the 2019 Open Championship. Straka also played in his first career major championship at the 2019 U.S. Open, after finishing tied for the lowest score at the sectional qualifying in Milton, Ontario. An opening round of 68 left Straka in a tie for 8th, and though two over-par rounds would follow, a final round of 67 left Straka in a tie for 28th place. Straka finished the regular PGA Tour in 107th place on the FedEx Cup rankings, to qualify him for the 2019 FedEx Cup Playoffs and ensure he would keep his card for the 2020 season.

Straka competed in the Men's individual event at the 2020 Summer Olympics, finishing tied-10th overall.

In February 2022, Straka won his first PGA Tour event at The Honda Classic in Palm Beach Gardens, Florida. He shot a final round 66 to win by one shot over Shane Lowry. Straka also became the first Austrian to win on the PGA Tour.

In August 2022, Straka tied for the lead with Will Zalatoris after 72 holes at the FedEx St. Jude Championship, entering a sudden-death playoff. Straka made a six-footer on the first playoff hole to extend, then another six-footer to extend again. On the third playoff hole, Straka hit his tee shot into the water, making double-bogey, while Zalatoris made a bogey to win. Straka lost another sudden-death playoff in October 2022, this time to Mackenzie Hughes at the Sanderson Farms Championship.

Professional wins (2)

PGA Tour wins (1)

PGA Tour playoff record (0–2)

Web.com Tour wins (1)

Results in major championships
Results not in chronological order in 2020.

CUT = missed the half-way cut
"T" = tied

Results in The Players Championship

CUT = missed the halfway cut
"T" indicates a tie for a place

Results in World Golf Championships

1Canceled due to the COVID-19 pandemic

"T" = Tied
NT = No tournament

Team appearances
Amateur
European Boys' Team Championship (representing Austria): 2011
Professional
Hero Cup (representing Continental Europe): 2023 (winners)

See also
2018 Web.com Tour Finals graduates

References

External links

Austrian male golfers
PGA Tour golfers
Olympic golfers of Austria
Golfers at the 2020 Summer Olympics
Korn Ferry Tour graduates
Georgia Bulldogs men's golfers
Golfers from Georgia (U.S. state)
Austrian expatriate sportspeople in the United States
Sportspeople from Vienna
People from Valdosta, Georgia
Sportspeople from Athens, Georgia
1993 births
Living people